Champions Online is a free-to-play superhero-themed massively multiplayer online role-playing game (MMORPG) developed by Cryptic Studios. The game is based on the Champions license and its rules and setting are loosely based on the HERO System ruleset. The game has been released for Microsoft Windows. An Xbox 360 version of the game was in development, but was cancelled in March 2010.

Gameplay

The game is an action-oriented role-playing game inspired by popular massively multiplayer games. Successful attacks and blocks increase a power meter which can then be spent to unleash more powerful actions. Death is handled in a similar manner to City of Heroes, in which a player may choose to be revived by a teammate or respawn at a neutral site. Heroes and villains from the Champions universe serve as major NPCs.

Unlike most MMOs, there are no armor pieces or armor sets to collect. Character clothing is purely cosmetic, along with most weapons. Damage is calculated by the basic stats of characters plus some extra calculations. Reflecting the game's original design as a console game, characters also possess much fewer skills than other early MMOs; however, each skill can be customized with a variety of player-chosen "Advantages." Endgame content is available at the level cap of 40.

The game features an "orb system" where enemies defeated by the player may drop orbs that temporarily benefit the hero's powers, life, or energy.

Additionally, it includes basic non-combat crafting skills, based on Science, Arms, and Magic. There are also a variety of travel powers, including swinging using grappling hooks, flying, rocket boot jumping, hover disks, super jump, super speed, teleportation, and acrobatics (fast running, leaps, and flips).

Locations
The action takes place in the Champions universe, featuring Champions characters as NPCs. Regions include urban sprawls, a dinosaur-infested island, underground ruins, and underwater lairs. Each region in the game is composed of several "instances" with up to 35 players per instance at any one time. This allows the game to run on one huge virtual server and for players to travel freely between instances to join with other players, rather than the game being fragmented into different servers. Many missions take place within smaller instances created especially for a team entering them. These instances are reset if the player leaves and returns. It is possible to revisit the same region to redo some missions again and again.

A special region called "the underground circuit" allows player vs. player competition. Stronghold, the setting's advanced prison for super-powered inmates, is used for player vs. player scenarios in which the player will take on the role of a supervillain trying to break out or a superhero trying to contain them.

Character creation
The game features a character creation system similar to City of Heroes, with additions such as the ability to edit a hero's movement animations, such as a beast-like hero opting to run and leap on all fours. The player may also edit the color and firing position of their powers, such as changing a power's energy animation from red to green or changing the animation to fire from the head instead of the palms.

Another difference from most MMOs was the original elimination of any character class or archetype system; characters can take any skill or power. However, since the launch of the "Free for All" version of the game, freeform character creation was limited to Gold members and several archetypes were introduced for both Gold (subscriber) members and Silver (free-to-play) members. The game also supports solo play throughout a hero's career if desired.

Archetypes
There are twelve archetypes available free to all members and an additional bonus one unlockable as a reward for reaching the level cap for the first time with any character. The game also has a variety of premium archetypes, which can be purchased via the game store. Some of the premium archetypes can be unlocked for free by participating in different events of the game by earning event currency during different times of the year such as Halloween or Christmas.

At level 25, players can create their own custom Nemesis along with their minions using the same character creation system used to make the player's character, with added selections specifically for the Nemesis. The Nemesis's minions will then ambush the player's hero, providing clues and information leading to Nemesis missions and eventually a showdown with the player's Nemesis. After the player character defeats their nemesis, they put them in jail and are allowed to make more nemeses until they reach the limit, which is 18 nemeses.

Development
The game's announcement followed the cancellation of Cryptic Studios' Marvel Universe Online as well as the sale of their Intellectual Properties City of Heroes and City of Villains to developer and publisher NCsoft in November 2007. On February 28, 2008, Cryptic Studios announced they had purchased the entire Champions intellectual property, licensing the rights to publish the 6th edition back to former owner Hero Games. The 6th edition books synergistically allowed players to adapt their Champions Online characters to the pen-and-paper roleplaying game.

On July 10, 2008, 2K Games announced they would be publishing the game. Registration for the closed beta testing period was announced on October 10, 2008. However, on December 17, 2008, 2K Games officially dropped the publishing of the game due to the takeover of Cryptic Studios by Atari. Atari then developed and published the game along with the ongoing development of Star Trek Online.

Release was originally set for July 14, but on May 16, 2009, Cryptic Studios announced that Champions Online would be delayed and the game was officially released September 1. Executive producer and design director Bill Roper cited that the team needed more time to implement important features that the beta test group felt were necessary at launch.
 
As announced by Cryptic Studios in July 2009, the game includes micro-transaction purchases. Most items available for purchase are vanity items that do not affect gameplay, such as costume pieces and in-game action figures. All items purchased are available to all characters on the account.

On July 20, 2009, a post on the official Champions Online Discussion Forum addressed the lack of any announcements regarding plans to release Champions Online on Xbox 360. It stated that "it has always been, and still remains our intent to release on consoles, and as soon as we're able to share more information about it, we will". The post also noted that the Xbox 360 FAQ had been removed from the Champions Online website. In a podcast interview for the gaming website vg247.com dated August 28, 2009, Jack Emmert elaborated on the issue, stating that the Xbox 360 version is "ready to go" but is facing an indefinite delay while awaiting Microsoft's approval, which is not readily forthcoming due to Microsoft's indecision on how to implement MMO's across Xbox Live.

On August 17, 2009, Cryptic Studios opened up their Beta servers for access through August 25 to allow the community to test and trial the system as well as submit bug reports and the game officially launched September 1, 2009. Those who pre-ordered the game gained instant access to the Open Beta on August 17 and some of those who pre-ordered (depending on their retailer) also gained access to an "Early Start" on the live servers beginning on August 28.

On September 1, 2009, Champions Online became available for purchase in-store as well as online stores. Pre-Order players were given until September 4 to enter their new product key to continue playing. The purchase included one free month of play and a special item specific to the retailer.

The game was originally available to paid subscribers only, but moved to the Free-to-play model on January 25, 2011.

Technology
The game uses a new game engine developed by Cryptic Studios for use in all of their new MMO projects. The characters feature a special cel-shading Cryptic Studios refers to as comic shading, which includes bump mapping and high-resolution texture mapping. Hero facial animation will be stressed as well, allowing them to show emotion.

References

External links
 
 Atari Champions Banner

Massively multiplayer online role-playing games
2009 video games
Active massively multiplayer online games
Atari games
Cancelled Xbox 360 games
Champions (role-playing game)
Free-to-play video games
Games for Windows certified games
Hero System
Persistent worlds
Role-playing video games
Superhero video games
Underwater civilizations in fiction
Video games based on tabletop role-playing games
Video games developed in the United States
Video games scored by Kevin Manthei
Video games with cel-shaded animation
Windows games
Windows-only games
Cryptic Studios games